The 1927–28 Swiss National Ice Hockey Championship was the 18th edition of the national ice hockey championship in Switzerland. EHC St. Moritz won the championship as HC Rosey Gstaad forfeited the final.

First round

Eastern Series 
 HC Davos - EHC St. Moritz 3:4 OT

EHC St. Moritz qualified for the final.

Western Series 
 HC Rosey Gstaad - HC Château-d’Œx 2:0

HC Rosey Gstaad qualified for the final.

Final 
 EHC St. Moritz - HC Rosey Gstaad 5:0 Forfeit

External links 
Swiss Ice Hockey Federation – All-time results

National
Swiss National Ice Hockey Championship seasons